This article presents lists of the literary events and publications in 2023.

Events

Anniversaries
100th anniversary of Time
100th anniversary of Weird Tales
100th anniversary of the publication of
Bambi, a Life in the Woods by Felix Salten
The Ego and the Id by Sigmund Freud
 "The Good Soldier Svejk by Jaroslav Hasek(last installment)
"The Horror at Martin's Beach" by H. P. Lovecraft
"Hypnos" by H. P. Lovecraft
"The Lurking Fear" by H. P. Lovecraft
"Memory" by H. P. Lovecraft
The Prophet by Kahlil Gibran
New Hampshire by Robert Frost
"Stopping by Woods on a Snowy Evening"
Saint Joan by George Bernard Shaw
Sonnets to Orpheus by Rainer Maria Rilke
Three Stories and Ten Poems by Ernest Hemingway
Toward an Architecture by Le Corbusier
"What the Moon Brings" by H. P. Lovecraft

New books 
Dates after each title indicate U.S. publication, unless otherwise indicated.

Fiction

Children and young adults

Poetry

Drama

Nonfiction

Biography and memoirs

Deaths

Awards

See also

References 

 
2023-related lists
Culture-related timelines by year
Years of the 21st century in literature